Periyalur  is a village in Pudukkottai District in the Indian state of Tamil Nadu. It is populated by approximately one thousand families.

Education 

In Aranthangi taluk, Periyalur is the most developed village in terms of education. 90% of the village is well-educated, with one to three members per family educated in Pudukkottai and Trichy. Students of this area are educated in many fields. 30% of Periyalur's students study engineering. People in Periyalur have received awards such as the "Best-Teacher" award to Mr. Arasappan, the Indian government's Yugavendira and Trichy Jeyam Social Youth Associations award to P. S. Uvaraj. It has 2 schools, one is an elementary school and another one is the high school where students can study up to 10th Standard. The village has an operational post office which is used by the people of periyalur for postal and saving needs.

Economy 
The primary occupation is agriculture. The nearby river has helped the village become more economically developed.

Temples 
Village temples include the Sri Kaaliyamman temple and the Sri Muthumariyamman temple, the Sri Vinayakar temple, Sri Mutulinga Ayyanar Swamy temple, Sri Karuppar Swamy temple, Sri Veerabathirar Swamy temple, Sri Ayyanar Swamy temple, and the Sri Kaluvathi Amman temple.  In every year, during the month of Chithirai, they used to pull a chariot.

Transport 
Bus facilities are available. Periyalur is on the route from Aranthangi to pattukkottai

References 

Villages in Pudukkottai district